New Hampshire Route 141 (abbreviated NH 141) is a  east–west state highway located entirely within the town of Franconia. Its western end is at New Hampshire Route 18. Its eastern end is at U.S. Route 3. It is called Butterhill Road for its entire length.  The New Hampshire Department of Transportation maintains a major depot here for plows and maintenance equipment.  It is the shortest New Hampshire state route in length.

Major intersections

References

External links

 New Hampshire State Route 141 on Flickr

141
Transportation in Grafton County, New Hampshire